Trichiurus is a genus of cutlassfishes belonging to the family Trichiuridae.

Species
Species within this genus include:

 Trichiurus auriga, Klunzinger, 1884 (Pearly hairtail)
 Trichiurus australis Chakraborty, Burhanuddin & Iwatsuki, 2005.
 Trichiurus brevis, Wang & You, 1992 (Chinese short-tailed hairtail)
 Trichiurus gangeticus, Gupta, 1966 (Ganges hairtail)
 Trichiurus lepturus, Linnaeus, 1758 (Largehead hairtail)
 Trichiurus margarites, Li, 1992
 Trichiurus nanhaiensis, Wang & Xu, 1992
 Trichiurus nickolensis, Burhanuddin & Iwatsuki, 2003 (Australian short-tailed hairtail)
 Trichiurus russelli, Dutt & Thankam, 1966 (Short-tailed hairtail)

Extinct species
Extinct species within this genus include:
 Trichiurus oshoshunensis Casier 1958 

Extinct species lived from the Eocene epoch to the Quaternary period, approximately from 48.6 to 0.012 million years ago. Fossils have been found in the Eocene sediments of Antarctica, Nigeria, United Kingdom, United States, in the Miocene of Costa Rica, India, Mexico, Panama, Slovakia and in the Quaternary of United States.

References

 

Trichiuridae
Prehistoric perciform genera
Extant Eocene first appearances
Marine fish genera
Taxa named by Carl Linnaeus